Lopatnik is a small settlement in the hills east of Velenje in northern Slovenia. The area is part of the traditional region of Styria. The entire Municipality of Velenje is now included in the Savinja Statistical Region.

References

External links
Lopatnik at Geopedia

Populated places in the City Municipality of Velenje